Bkurrengel also known as Bkulrengel is a village in Aimeliik, Palau. It is located on the west coast of Babeldaob. The Palauan god Iechadrengel who created the sun and moon is said to have lived in Bkurrengel.

See also
List of cities, towns and villages in Palau

References

Populated places in Palau
Aimeliik